Bathylagoides is a genus of deep-sea smelts.

Species
Three recognized species are in this genus:
 Bathylagoides argyrogaster (Norman, 1930) (silver deepsea smelt)
 Bathylagoides greyae (A. E. Parr, 1931) (blackchin blacksmelt)
 Bathylagoides wesethi (Bolin, 1938) (snubnose blacksmelt)

References

 
Taxa named by Gilbert Percy Whitley
Marine fish genera